Joseph Henry Thomas (March 18, 1921 – February 10, 1983) was a National Football League (NFL) general manager and also served as the head coach of the Baltimore Colts for part of the 1974 season.

Minnesota Vikings and Miami Dolphins
Thomas was director of player personnel for the Minnesota Vikings (1960–65) and the Miami Dolphins from 1965 until his contract dispute with team owner Joe Robbie culminated with his resignation on February 22, 1972. He was succeeded by Bobby Beathard three days later. The Dolphins won the subsequent two Super Bowls.

Baltimore Colts
Thomas arranged for Robert Irsay to purchase the Los Angeles Rams from the estate of Dan Reeves for $19 million before exchanging them for Carroll Rosenbloom's Baltimore Colts in an unprecedented transaction which was completed on July 13, 1972. He became general manager of the Colts, succeeding Don Klosterman who transitioned to the Rams in a similar capacity. 

When the ballclub opened 1972 at 1–4, he fired head coach Don McCafferty on October 16 and replaced him with defensive line coach John Sandusky who was ordered by Thomas to start younger players over the veterans. The result was Johnny Unitas being benched for the remainder of the season in favor of Marty Domres. After the 5–9 Colts finished its first losing campaign in sixteen years, he dismissed Sandusky and his entire coaching staff on December 20.

He was reunited with Dolphins offensive coordinator Howard Schnellenberger who was named as Sandusky's successor eight weeks later on February 14, 1973. When the Colts went 4–13 over parts of two seasons with Schnellenberger at the helm, Thomas was named to replace him by Irsay following a 30–10 loss to the Philadelphia Eagles at Veterans Stadium on September 29, 1974. Irsay had first gone to the press box to inform Thomas that he was the new head coach and then to the locker room to announce his actions to the Colts players before breaking the news to Schnellenberger in a heated discussion in the coaches office.

Weeks prior to hiring Schnellenberger, Thomas purged the team of its veteran players, beginning with trading Unitas to the San Diego Chargers on January 22, 1973. Within the next ten days, Tom Matte would follow Unitas to San Diego, Bill Curry was sent to the Houston Oilers, Billy Newsome to the New Orleans Saints, Norm Bulaich to the Philadelphia Eagles and Jerry Logan to the Rams. The Newsome deal brought to the Colts the second overall selection in the 1973 NFL Draft which was used to pick Bert Jones. In that draft and the one the following year, Thomas would also select a pair of blind-side offensive linemen in David Taylor and Robert Pratt and an entire defensive line of Joe Ehrmann, Mike Barnes, John Dutton and Fred Cook.

After the Colts qualified for the NFL playoffs by winning the AFC East title in each of two consecutive seasons in 1975 and 1976, Thomas lost a power struggle over player personnel decisions to head coach Ted Marchibroda and was fired by Irsay on January 21, 1977. The Colts had five different head coaches during Thomas' five-year tenure, one of whom was himself.

San Francisco 49ers
Thomas then was hired as GM of the San Francisco 49ers in 1977 by new owner Eddie DeBartolo at the recommendation of Al Davis and immediately fired head coach Monte Clark. The 49ers went 7–23 in his two seasons with the franchise, and his biggest trade, a series of 5 high draft picks for OJ Simpson. He also fired two more head coaches, Ken Meyer and Pete McCulley. Thomas and his third 49ers head coach Fred O'Connor were dismissed on January 8, 1979, one day prior to Bill Walsh succeeding the latter.

Personal life
Thomas married the former Judi Demian in 1969. They had a daughter, Paige, in June 1970.

Thomas died on February 10, 1983, at the age of 61. He was living in Miami and was VP of the Miami Dolphins at the time of his death.

References

1921 births
1983 deaths
Baltimore Colts head coaches
Baltimore Colts executives
Miami Dolphins executives
San Francisco 49ers executives
Minnesota Vikings executives
National Football League general managers